Ziga may refer to:

People
 David Kwaku Ziga (born 1922), Ghanaian politician and potter
 Patricia Foufoué Ziga (born 1972), Côte d'Ivoire sprinter
 Tecla San Andres Ziga (1906–1992), Filipino politician
 Victor Ziga, Filipino politician

Places
 Ziga Department, Sanmatenga Province, Burkina Faso
 Ziga, Burkina Faso
 Ziga, Navarre, Spain

Other
 Žiga, a Slovene male given name